Spartak Iosifovich Makovsky (27 November 1920 — 27 March  2000) was a Soviet fighter pilot and Hero of the Soviet Union who became a flying ace during World War II, tallying an estimated 25 solo and three shared shootdowns. He was also awarded the Order of Lenin, 3 Orders of the Red Banner, the Order of Alexander Nevsky, 2 Orders of the Patriotic War 1st class, and the Order of the Red Star.

References

1920 births
2000 deaths
Soviet World War II flying aces
Soviet military personnel of World War II
Recipients of the Order of the Red Banner
Recipients of the Order of Alexander Nevsky
People from Pavlodar
Heroes of the Soviet Union